Cyta may refer to:

 Cyta (mite)
 CYTA, Cypriot telecommunications provider
 Pembroke Airport, Canada (by ICAO code)